John Bull (born June 1, 1731 in Montgomery, Pennsylvania) held the rank of Colonel in Pennsylvania's 2nd Regiment during the American Revolution. He is the son of Thomas Bull and Elizabeth Rossiter. He was appointed Colonel on May 2, 1777. On June 17, 1777, he was promoted to Adjutant General of the Pennsylvania Militia by the Pennsylvania Supreme Executive Council.

Death
He died on August 9, 1824 in Northumberland, Pennsylvania and is buried there. He was the father of six children.

References

External links
 UNIFORMS OF THE AMERICAN REVOLUTION -- Pennsylvania State Regiment, 1777 - 13th Pennsylvania Line – useful website
 Minutes of the Supreme Executive Council of Pennsylvania, from its organization to the termination of the Revolution. [Mar. 4, 1777 - Dec. 20, 1790] – Pennsylvania Executive Council Minutes, page 247
 Colonel John Bull – genealogy records
 Record of the descendents of John and Elizabeth Bull, early settlers in Pennsylvania

Continental Army officers
1731 births
1824 deaths